In mathematics, particularly in functional analysis, a Mackey space is a locally convex topological vector space X such that the topology of X coincides with the Mackey topology τ(X,X′), the finest topology which still preserves the continuous dual. They are named after George Mackey.

Examples

Examples of locally convex spaces that are Mackey spaces include:
 All barrelled spaces  and more generally all infrabarreled spaces 
 Hence in particular all bornological spaces  and reflexive spaces
 All metrizable spaces.
 In particular, all Fréchet spaces, including all Banach spaces and specifically Hilbert spaces, are Mackey spaces. 
 The product, locally convex direct sum, and the inductive limit of a family of Mackey spaces is a Mackey space.

Properties

 The completion of a Mackey space is again a Mackey space.
 A separated quotient of a Mackey space is again a Mackey space.
 A Mackey space need not be separable, complete, quasi-barrelled, nor -quasi-barrelled.

See also

References

  
   
   
 
   

Topological vector spaces